Teeterville may refer to:

 Teeterville, Ontario, a community in Norfolk County, Ontario, Canada
 Teeterville, Georgia, an unincorporated community in Lanier County, Georgia, United States
 Teeterville Public School, a school under the jurisdiction of Grand Erie District School Board in Norfolk County, Ontario, Canada
 Teeterville Pioneer Museum, a museum in Norfolk County, Ontario
 Teterville, Kansas or Teeterville, a ghost town whose post office operated 1927–1962